The Battle of Demotika was a battle that took place during the Byzantine civil war which began in 1352 between the forces of the Ottoman Empire and those of the Serbian Empire and Second Bulgarian Empire.

Background 
John Palaiologos obtained the help of Serbia, while John Kantakouzenos sought help from Orhan I, the Ottoman bey. Kantakouzenos marched into Thrace to rescue his son, Matthew, who was attacked by Palaiologos shortly after being given this appanage and then refusing to recognize John Palaiologos as heir to the throne. Ottoman troops retook some cities that had surrendered to John Palaiologos, and Kantakouzenos allowed the troops to plunder the cities, including Adrianople. Thus it seemed that Kantakouzenos was defeating John Palaiologos, who now retreated to Serbia.

Battle 
Emperor Stefan Dušan sent Palaiologos a cavalry force of 4,000 or 6,000 under the command of Gradislav Borilović while Orhan I provided Kantakouzenos 10,000 horsemen. Also Bulgarian tsar Ivan Alexander sent an unknown number of troops to support Palaiologos and Dušan. The two armies met at an open-field battle near Demotika (modern Didymoteicho) in October 1352, which would decide the fate of the Byzantine Empire, without the direct involvement of the Byzantines. The more numerous Ottomans decisively defeated the Serbs and Bulgarians, and Kantakouzenos retained power, while Palaiologos fled to Venetian Tenedos. According to Kantakouzenos about 7,000 Serbs fell at the battle (deemed exaggerated), while Nikephoros Gregoras (1295–1360) gave the number as 4,000.

Aftermath 
The battle was the first major battle of the Ottomans on European soil, and it made Stefan Dušan realize the major threat of the Ottomans to Eastern Europe.

References

Sources
 
, chapter 40
 

1350s in the Byzantine Empire
1352 in the Ottoman Empire
Serbian Empire
Demotika
Demotika
Demotika
Demotika
Demotika
History of Didymoteicho